Anastasiya Hennadiyivna Savchuk (born 2 March 1996) is a Ukrainian competitor in synchronized swimming.

She won 3 bronze medals at the 2013 World Aquatics Championships, a silver and a bronze medal at the 2017 World Aquatics Championships and a silver and a gold at the 2014 European Aquatics Championships.

In 2018, Savchuk and Yelyzaveta Yakhno won the silver medal in both the duet technical routine and duet free routine at the 2018 European Aquatics Championships.

References

External links
 
 
 
 

1996 births
Living people
Ukrainian synchronized swimmers
Olympic synchronized swimmers of Ukraine
Synchronized swimmers at the 2016 Summer Olympics
World Aquatics Championships medalists in synchronised swimming
Synchronized swimmers at the 2013 World Aquatics Championships
Synchronized swimmers at the 2015 World Aquatics Championships
Synchronized swimmers at the 2017 World Aquatics Championships
Artistic swimmers at the 2019 World Aquatics Championships
European Aquatics Championships medalists in synchronised swimming
European Championships (multi-sport event) silver medalists
Sportspeople from Kharkiv
Synchronized swimmers at the 2020 Summer Olympics
Medalists at the 2020 Summer Olympics
Olympic bronze medalists for Ukraine
Olympic medalists in synchronized swimming
21st-century Ukrainian women